James Berges was president of Emerson Electric Corp from 1999 until he retired in 2005. He resides in St. Louis, Missouri. He was involved in the company for over 30 years. Mr. Berges, with a degree in electrical engineering from the University of Notre Dame, previously worked for General Electric Corp. He earned compensation of $9.5 million in 2005.

External links 
'Emerson President James G. Berges to Retire November 1' (Emerson News)

General Electric people
PPG Industries people
Living people
Year of birth missing (living people)